Argyroeides is a genus of moths in the subfamily Arctiinae. The genus was erected by Arthur Gardiner Butler in 1876.

Species

References

 
Euchromiina
Moth genera